Jacob Swoope (ca. 17661832) was an eighteenth and nineteenth century politician from Virginia.

Biography
Born in Philadelphia in the Province of Pennsylvania around 1766, Swoope attended the common schools as a child. He moved to Staunton, Virginia in 1789 and held several local offices before being elected the first mayor of Staunton under the new charter of 1801. He was reelected mayor in 1804 before being elected a Federalist to the United States House of Representatives in 1808, serving from 1809 to 1811 having defeated Democratic-Republican Daniel Smith. Swoope died in Staunton in 1832 and was interred there in Trinity Episcopal Churchyard.

References

External links

Jacob Swoope at The Political Graveyard

1766 births
1832 deaths
Mayors of Staunton, Virginia
Politicians from Philadelphia
Date of death missing
Federalist Party members of the United States House of Representatives from Virginia